Judith McMillan (born 1945) is an American artist. Her work is included in the collections of the Whitney Museum of American Art and the Cleveland Museum of Art.

References

20th-century American artists
20th-century American women artists
1945 births
Living people
21st-century American women